Jaroslav Tetiva (alternate spelling: Tětiva; 4 February 1932 – 2 March 2021) was a Czech basketball player. He was voted to the Czechoslovakian 20th Century Team in 2001.

With the senior Czechoslovakian national team, Tetiva competed in the men's tournament at the 1960 Summer Olympics. With Czechoslovakia, he also won the silver medal at the 1955 EuroBasket, the bronze medal at the 1957 EuroBasket, and the silver medal at the 1959 EuroBasket.

References

External links
FIBA Profile

1932 births
2021 deaths
Czech men's basketball players
Olympic basketball players of Czechoslovakia
Basketball players at the 1960 Summer Olympics
Sportspeople from Chomutov